Morganville Pottery Factory Site is an archeological site located at Morganville in Genesee County, New York. It was the location of a factory that produced ceramics and tile from 1829 until the end of the 19th century.

An excavation in 1973 by a team from the Rochester Museum and Science Center yielded many artifacts. It was listed on the National Register of Historic Places in 1974.

See also
National Register of Historic Places listings in Genesee County, New York

References

Geography of Genesee County, New York
Archaeological sites on the National Register of Historic Places in New York (state)
Ceramics manufacturers of the United States
National Register of Historic Places in Genesee County, New York